The 2012–13 season was the 79th season in the existence of AS Saint-Étienne and the club's ninth consecutive season in the top flight of French football. In addition to the domestic league, Saint-Étienne participated in this season's editions of the Coupe de France and the Coupe de la Ligue. The season covered the period from 1 July 2012 to 30 June 2013.

Players

First-team squad

Out on loan

Reserves 
As of 2 August 2012

Pre-season and friendlies

Competitions

Overview

Ligue 1

League table

Results summary

Results by round

Matches

Coupe de France

Coupe de la Ligue

References

External links

AS Saint-Étienne seasons
Saint-Étienne